The 1982 NCAA Division I men's lacrosse tournament was the 12th annual Division I NCAA Men's Lacrosse Championship tournament. Twelve NCAA Division I college men's lacrosse teams met after having played their way through a regular season, and for some, a conference tournament.

The championship game was hosted by University of Virginia, and was played in front of 10,283 fans. The game saw the University of North Carolina defeat Johns Hopkins University by the score of 7–5.

Overview 

This was the second straight defeat of Hopkins by the University of North Carolina in the finals. The Tar Heels carried a 7 to 3 lead heading into the fourth quarter, with attackman Dave Wingate scoring five goals for Carolina. The Tar Heels won 26th straight games over two seasons, finally losing the first game of the 1983 season against Hobart.

UNC used an aggressive zone defense against Hopkins and UNC goalie Tom Sears made the saves when he had to, finishing with 16 saves. Dave Wingate scored 5 goals for UNC, and Brian Holman finished with 19 saves for Hopkins.

Bracket

Box scores
Tournament Finals

Tournament Semi-Finals - May 22, 1982

Tournament Quarterfinals

Outstanding players
Tom Sears, North Carolina (Named the tournament's Most Outstanding Player)

1982 DIVISION I CHAMPIONSHIP HIGHLIGHTS
LEADING SCORERS
Name ................................................................................................... GP G A Pts.

Doug Hall, North Carolina .......................................................................... 3 5 3 8
John Krumenacker, Johns Hopkins.............................................................. 3 5 3 8
Brent Voelkel, North Carolina ..................................................................... 3 5 3 8
Jeff Cook, Johns Hopkins........................................................................... 3 3 5 8
Mike Donnelly, Johns Hopkins .................................................................... 3 6 1 7
Jeff Homire, North Carolina........................................................................ 3 5 2 7
Bruce Bruno, Cornell ................................................................................. 2 1 6 7

See also
1982 NCAA Women's Lacrosse Championship
1982 NCAA Division III Lacrosse Championship

References

External links 
1982 Title Game JHU v UNC on Youtube

NCAA Division I Men's Lacrosse Championship
NCAA Division I Men's Lacrosse Championship
NCAA Division I Men's Lacrosse Championship
NCAA Division I Men's Lacrosse Championship
NCAA Division I Men's Lacrosse Championship
NCAA Division I Men's Lacrosse Championship